Greeneville may refer to the following places in the United States:

Greeneville (Norwich, Connecticut), a historic neighborhood in the city of Norwich, Connecticut.
 Greeneville, Tennessee, a town in and the county seat of Greene County, Tennessee.

See also
 Greenville (disambiguation)
 List of places named for Nathanael Greene